Austin Public Health (Spanish: Salud Pública de Austin) is the official health department of the city of Austin, Texas, which operates programs to improve general health in the community.

History

Background
Austin was the first municipality in Texas to include public health provisions in its incorporation act, approved in 1839 by the Congress of the Republic of Texas.

Accreditation and name change
Austin Public Health, then known as Austin/Travis County Health and Human Services Department, received accreditation  from the national Public Health Accreditation Board in May 2016. The department adopted its current name that December.

Leadership
Adrienne Sturrup, Director
Dr. Desmar Walkes, Medical Director and Health Authority
Janet Pichette, Chief Epidemiologist
Laura G. La Fuente, Assistant Director of Health Equity and Community Engagement
Kymberley Maddox, Asisstant Director of Administrative Support Services 
Donna Sundstrom, Assistant Director of Community Services
Marcel Elizondo, Interim Assistant Director of Environmental Health Services
Cassandra DeLeon, Assistant director of Disease Prevention and Health Promotion
Jen Samp, Public Information and Marketing Manager

Organization
Austin Public Health is composed of the following divisions which manage the listed services:
   Community Services
               Women, Infants and Children program
         Neighborhood centers
         Family health unit
         Day labor center
      
     
   Disease Prevention and Health Promotion
               Chronic disease prevention and control
         Communicable disease
         Immunizations
         Injury prevention
         Refugee services
      
   Environmental and Health Services
               Public health nuisances
         Child care, foster care, and adoption housing
         
         Food safety
         Pool, spas, interactive water features & fountains
          Mosquito and rodent control
      
   Epidemiology and Public Health Preparedness
               Epidemiology and disease surveillance
         Public health emergency preparedness
         Vital records
      
   
   Health Equity and Community Engagement
               Health equity initiative 
         Planning and evaluation
         Social services
         HIV resources administration
         Community transformation (DSRIP) programs

References

Government of Austin, Texas
Health departments in Texas